WD may refer to:

Arts and entertainment 
 The Walking Dead (TV series)
 Watership Down
 White Dwarf (magazine)

Businesses and organizations

Government agencies 
 Royal Canadian Air Force Women's Division
 War Department (United Kingdom)

Other businesses and organizations 
 DAS Air Cargo (IATA code WD)
 Wardair (defunct IATA code WD)
 WD-40 Company, manufacturer of household and multi-use products, well known for its signature brand, WD-40.
 Western Digital, a computer storage manufacturer
 Western Economic Diversification Canada, a Canadian government agency
 Wikidata, a Wikimedia Foundation collaborative online project
 Wilts & Dorset, a southern England bus operator
 Winn-Dixie, an American supermarket chain

Places 
 WD postcode area, England, UK
 County Waterford, Ireland

Science and technology 
 WD-40, a penetrating oil spray
 Band 3, a protein
 Web Dynpro, a web application for developing business applications
 Whipple's disease, a rare, systemic infectious disease caused by the bacterium Tropheryma whipplei
 White dwarf, a compact star in astronomy
 Working directory, in computing
 Western Digital,a storage brand

Other uses 
 Walt Disney, American cartoonist and businessman
 Wedding Day
 Weekday
 "Well done", in Internet slang
 Withdrawal (disambiguation)
 Wing defence, position in netball
 Working Draft, a stage in standardization process of the International Organization for Standardization

See also 
 Watchdog (disambiguation)